Mambo y Canela is a 2002 Venezuelan telenovela produced by Venevisión and distributed internationally by Venevisión International. Alicia Machado and Marcelo Cezán starred as the main protagonists.

Plot
The love between Canela and Rodrigo is one that has grown out of friendship. Canela is a cheerful young girl who is in love with mambo, although she was in an orphanage and lived a harsh life. She finally lands a job as a product demonstrator, part of a team which participates in conferences and exclusive hotels. During one of these events, she meets Rodrigo, a photographer and son of a powerful businessman. Rodrigo has been cut off from his family after refusing to be in charge of the family business to pursue photography. There is an immediate spark between them even though he is courting Vanessa, a beautiful and sophisticated lawyer. However, things get complicated for the lovers when Canela is accused of killing Rodrigo's father.

Cast
Alicia Machado as Canela
Marcelo Cezán as Rodrigo
Eileen Abad as Vicky
Adolfo Cubas as Franco
Carlota Sosa as Paulina
Caridad Canelon as Agua Santa
Daniel Alvarado as Kiko León
Vicente Tepedino as Nando
Juan Carlos Vivas as Cosme
Betsabe Duque as Vanessa
Jorge Reyes as Daniel Montoya
Daniel Alvarado as Kiko León "Magallanes"
Veronica Schneider as Wanda

References

External links
Mambo y canela at the Internet Movie Database

2002 telenovelas
Venezuelan telenovelas
Venevisión telenovelas
2002 Venezuelan television series debuts
2002 Venezuelan television series endings
Spanish-language telenovelas
Television shows set in Caracas